The following is a list of notable avant-pop artists. Individuals are listed by surname.

List

1-!
 100 gecs

A
A.R. Kane
Allie X
Tori Amos
 Laurie Anderson
 Animal Collective
 Fiona Apple
 Arca
 Atlas Sound
 Aurora
 Autechre

B
 Bad Brains
 The Beach Boys
 Beck
 Belly
 Björk
 Emily Blue
 David Bowie (between 1977–79)
 Lester Bowie
 Kate Bush
 The Byrds

C
 Camille
 Charli XCX
 Clinic
 Coil

D
 Terence Trent D'Arby
 Depeche Mode
 Devo

E
 Dorian Electra
 Brian Eno

F
 The Feelies
 FKA Twigs
 The Flaming Lips

G
 Gauntlet Hair
 Githead
Genesis
Genesis P-Orridge
GFOTY

H
 Here We Go Magic
 The High Llamas
 Holly Herndon
 Jenny Hval

I

J
 Grace Jones
 Daniel Johnston

K
 Konstrakta
 Fela Kuti

L
 Lorde
 John Lennon and Yoko Ono

M
 Maneige
 John Maus
 Memory Cassette
 Mercury Rev
 Mis-Teeq
 Momus
 My Bloody Valentine
 Róisín Murphy

N

O
 Frank Ocean
 Of Montreal
 The Olivia Tremor Control
 Os Mutantes

P
 Penguin Cafe Orchestra
 Ariel Pink
 Caroline Polachek
 The Pop Group
 P.J. Proby

Q

R
 The Residents 
 Roxy Music (early records)

S
 Sevdaliza
 SOPHIE
 Slapp Happy
 Spookey Ruben
 Jack Stauber
 St. Vincent
 Stavely Makepeace
 Stereolab
 The Sugarcubes
 A Sunny Day in Glasgow

T
 Talk Talk
 Talking Heads
 Trip Shakespeare
 Tune-Yards
 Tycho

U

V 
The Velvet Underground

W
 Scott Walker
 Was (Not Was)
 Ween
Kanye West
 Brian Wilson (between 1965–67)
 Will Wood
 Win

X
 XTC

Y
 Yes

Z
 Frank Zappa

See also
Art pop
Experimental pop
Outsider music
Avant-funk
Vaporwave

References

Avant-pop music
Lists of bands